Eldis is a database and email service of information sources on international development. It aims to share the best knowledge on development, policy, practice and research.

Background 
"Eldis" was originally an acronym for "Electronic Development and Environment Information System". It is one of a family of knowledge services produced at the Institute of Development Studies, Sussex, England.

Funding 
Eldis is funded by the UK Department for International Development (DFID), Swedish International Development Cooperation Agency (Sida), the Norwegian Agency for Development Cooperation (Norad) and the Swiss Agency for Development and Cooperation (SDC).

Database 
The information in Eldis is organised into subject-focused "resource guides" and regional and country "profiles."

References

Bibliography

External links 
 
 Eldis community site and social network.

International development
Document-oriented databases
University of Sussex